The Al Salam Tecom Tower is a 47-floor tower in the Dubai Media City in Dubai, United Arab Emirates. The tower has a total structural height of 195 m (640 ft). Construction of the Al Salam Tecom Tower was completed in 2008.

On 14 May 2008, a fire broke out on the 47th floor of Al Salam Tecom Tower.  There were no reported injuries. The roof of the building is shaped on an angle where it would draw a straight line to Mecca if extended. This rooftop quirk is copied on the NBAD Tower nearby.

See also 
 List of tallest buildings in Dubai

References

External links

Emporis

Residential skyscrapers in Dubai
Buildings and structures in Dubai Media City
Office buildings completed in 2008
Residential buildings completed in 2008
Skyscraper office buildings in Dubai